The first season of The Real Housewives of Orange County, an American reality television series, was broadcast on Bravo. It aired from March 21, 2006 until May 9, 2006, and was primarily filmed in Orange County, California. Its executive producers are Adam Karpel, Alex Baskin, Douglas Ross, Gregory Stewart, Scott Dunlop, Stephanie Boyriven and Andy Cohen.

The Real Housewives of Orange County focuses on the lives of Kimberly Bryant, Jo De La Rosa, Vicki Gunvalson, Jeana Keough and Lauri Waring. It consisted of eight episodes, all of which aired on Tuesday evenings.

Production and crew
In April 2005, The Real Housewives was announced as one of six reality television series ordered by the American television channel Bravo; before its premiere, it was renamed The Real Housewives of Orange County in January 2006. One of its producers, Scott Dunlop, commented that it was originally planned to be set in a single gated community in Coto de Caza, California. A press release issued by the network noted that the series was inspired by the scripted soap operas Desperate Housewives and Peyton Place, and would document the lives of upper-class women who "lead glamorous lives in a picturesque Southern California gated community where the average home has a $1.6 million price tag and residents include CEOs and retired professional athletes." 

In August 2016, Keough, now a former cast member, revealed on Oprah: Where are they Now? that it was her family that inspired the series due to the producer, Scott Dunlop, being her neighbor at the time and writing the show about Keough and her family. Keough also went on to claim the success of the show was the time was due to timing, saying "the writers’ strike was on, so we became hugely successful for lack of anything else on TV."

The series premiere "Meet the Wives" was aired on March 21, 2006, while the seventh episode "The Finale" served as the season finale, and was aired on May 2, 2006. It was followed by a reunion which marked the conclusion of the season and was broadcast on May 9, 2006. Adam Karpel, Alex Baskin, Douglas Ross, Gregory Stewart, Scott Dunlop, Stephanie Boyriven and Andy Cohen are recognized as the series' executive producers; it is produced and distributed by Evolution Media.

Cast and synopsis
Five housewives were featured during the first season of The Real Housewives of Orange County, who were described as "women who are living lives of privilege and indulgence, replete with gorgeous homes, privileged offspring and fabulous bling."
The first season sees Bryant discussing her family's move from Baltimore to Coto de Caza while dealing with a health scare, while De La Rosa's relationship with her fiancé Slade Smiley presents struggles. Gunvalson runs her own insurance company, for which Waring is an employee. Waring struggles financially after her divorce from her unnamed ex-husband, deals with her teenage son Josh's frequent run-ins with the law, and unexpectedly sees her young adult daughter Ashley move back in with the family after previously living in Los Angeles. With her husband Matt Keough often away traveling for work, Keough raises her children Shane, Kara, and Colton fairly independently. The reunion seating chart is as follows: 

Kimberly Bryant was absent from the reunion, and did not return the following season.

Episodes

References

External links

 
 
 

2006 American television seasons
Orange County (season 1)